Karl Göran Abrahamsson (19 September 1931 – 6 March 2018) was a Swedish épée and foil fencer. He competed at the 1960 and 1964 Summer Olympics.

Awards
   Swedish Fencing Federation Royal Medal of Merit in gold (Svenska fäktförbundets kungliga förtjänstmedalj i guld) (2002)

References

External links
 

1931 births
2018 deaths
Swedish male épée fencers
Swedish male foil fencers
Olympic fencers of Sweden
Fencers at the 1960 Summer Olympics
Fencers at the 1964 Summer Olympics
Sportspeople from Gothenburg
Universiade medalists in fencing
Universiade bronze medalists for Sweden
Medalists at the 1959 Summer Universiade
20th-century Swedish people